Events from the year 1789 in the Dutch Republic

Events

 - Villa Welgelegen

Births

Deaths

 
 
 
 

1789 in the Dutch Republic
1780s in the Dutch Republic
Years of the 18th century in the Dutch Republic